The Macaé class are a series of offshore patrol vessels being built for the Brazilian Navy by Indústria Naval do Ceará (INACE) to a CMN Vigilante 400 CL54 design.

History 
The class was based on the CMN Vigilante 400 CL54 design. The original plan for the class was to create 46 ships, although the navy shrunk their ambition shortly thereafter, settling on only 27 ships above 500 tons. The first two Macaé class ships were built by INACE, following a 2006 contract. It was delivered in 2012, while the second ship was delivered in 2010. The other ships are under construction.

Ships of class

References

External links
 CMN Group

Ships built in Brazil
Patrol vessels of the Brazilian Navy
Patrol ship classes